The Ari language is a Papuan language of the Trans–New Guinea family. According to the 2000 census, there were only 50 Ari speakers, living in the two villages of Ari and Serea in Gogodala Rural LLG.

The language that most resembles Ari is the Gogodala language.

Phonology

References

Sources
Reesink, Ger P. 1976. Languages of the Aramia River area. In: Ger P. Reesink, L. Fleischmann, S. Turpeinen, Peter Lincoln. (eds.), Papers in New Guinea Linguistics No. 19, 1–37. Canberra: Pacific Linguistics.

Languages of Papua New Guinea
Gogodala–Suki languages
Severely endangered languages